"Holy Key" is a hip hop single by American musician DJ Khaled, featuring American rappers Big Sean, Kendrick Lamar and American singer Betty Wright. It was released on July 22, 2016, by We the Best Music Group and Epic Records as the third single of DJ Khaled's ninth studio album, Major Key. The song was produced by Cool & Dre.

Background
Whilst in the process of recording "Holy Key", Khaled told Sean; "Yo. This record? I don’t want no rules, no regulations, I don’t want no regular song structure. I want you to just go bad. Catch the Holy Ghost and just… This is your chance to spit them bars. Even though you spit them all the time. Big this is a special one we gonna do it on." Khaled approached Kendrick Lamar about doing a feature on the song at a basketball game in LA they were both attending. Lamar responded to the idea of a possible collaboration; "No doubt, Khaled. I love what youre doing right now. I love how you're inspiring the world and the kids with your music. Send it through." Khaled was hesitant to send the song immediately as he "wanted to make sure it was the right record", and with Lamar's schedule being busy, Khaled feared the record not being done on time. Lamar's verse was sent two days after Khaled spoke to him.

In the days leading up to the release of "Holy Key", DJ Khaled went on SnapChat and teased by yelling "Ay Juan, did the Kendrick vocals get here yet?" and that Kendrick would have the most talked about verse on his album. Khaled would then proceed to comment on the single: "Man, we did our damn thing. Those are two different rappers and guess what? They both great. That's how you make records. I'm not here just to make a record. That’s not what Khaled does. I'ma try to bring the best out of everybody!"

Chart performance
"Holy Key" debuted at number 84 on the Billboard Hot 100 for the chart dated August 20, 2016.

Charts

Release history

References

External links

2016 songs
2016 singles
DJ Khaled songs
Betty Wright songs
Kendrick Lamar songs
Big Sean songs
Songs written by DJ Khaled
Songs written by Kendrick Lamar
Songs written by Big Sean
Songs written by Betty Wright
Epic Records singles
Song recordings produced by DJ Khaled
Songs written by Dre (record producer)